The Daily Excelsior is an English-language newspaper published in Jammu, a city in the Indian union territory of Jammu and Kashmir. It was established by S. D. Rohmetra. The newspaper has been in publication since 1 January 1965. Its current editors are Kamal Rohmetra and Neeraj Rohmetra.

History 
Started as a weekly English newspaper in 1965, it became a daily English newspaper in 1967.

Journalist death
On 11 May 2008 photojournalist Ashok Sodhi was killed while photographing an armed confrontation between terrorists and security forces in the Samba District of Jammu and Kashmir. He had moved closer to capture better coverage of the confrontation when a stray bullet hit him.

See also
 Communications in India
 List of newspapers in India
 Media of India

References

External links
Daily Excelsior website

English-language newspapers published in India
Newspapers established in 1965
Jammu (city)
Mass media in Jammu and Kashmir
1965 establishments in Jammu and Kashmir